Detector is a 2000 Norwegian comedy film directed by Pål Jackman from a screenplay by Erlend Loe and produced by Edward A. Dreyer. It was entered into the 23rd Moscow International Film Festival.

Cast
 Mads Ousdal as Daniel Jor
 Hildegun Riise as Daniel's Mother
 Ingjerd Egeberg as Janne / Silje
 Allan Svensson as Max
 Harald Eia as Ronny
 Jon Øigarden as Kenneth
 Sverre Porsanger as Ante
 Kristoffer Joner as Jørgen
 Svein Sturla Hungnes as Gordon
 Nina Andresen Borud as Hege Drag (as Nina Andresen)
 Hans Eirik Voktor as Martinsen

References

External links
 

2000 films
2000 comedy films
2000s Norwegian-language films
Norwegian comedy films